Felipe Andrés Aguilar Schuller (born November 7, 1974) is a Chilean professional golfer who plays on the European Tour.

Career
In 2006 he became the second Chilean, after Roy Mackenzie to earn full membership to the European Tour but failed to retain full playing rights at the end of the season. In 2007 he won two events on the Challenge Tour in a 4-week span. Due to his success on the Challenge Tour he rejoined the European Tour in 2008.

In February 2008, Aguilar won his first European Tour event at the Astro Indonesia Open. He birdied the final hole while the erstwhile leader Jeev Milkha Singh bogeyed for a two shot swing that saw the Chilean win by one stroke.

In April 2013, Aguilar was part of the joint longest sudden-death playoff, lasting nine extra holes, in European Tour history at the Open de España. He was eliminated at the third extra hole when he made par. He ended 50th in the Race to Dubai with eight top 10s in 27 tournaments.

In May 2014, Aguilar won his second European Tour title at The Championship at Laguna National, a co-sanctioned event with the Asian Tour. Aguilar shot a final round 62, which included a birdie-eagle finish in a 28 on the back nine to storm through the field and take a one shot victory.

Aguilar won the gold medal at the 2014 South American Games and the bronze medal at the 2015 Pan American Games

Amateur wins
1990 Chilean Amateur Open
1991 Chilean Amateur Open, South American Championship
1992 Chilean Amateur Open

Professional wins (13)

European Tour wins (2)

1Co-sanctioned by the Asian Tour

European Tour playoff record (0–1)

Challenge Tour wins (2)

Challenge Tour playoff record (2–0)

Tour de las Américas wins (1)

Alps Tour wins (2)

PGA Tour Latinoamérica Developmental Series wins (4)

Other wins (2)
2002 Chile Open
2017 Chile Open

Results in World Golf Championships

"T" = Tied

Team appearances

Amateur
Eisenhower Trophy (representing Chile): 1996, 1998

Professional
World Cup (representing Chile): 2003, 2008, 2013

See also
2005 European Tour Qualifying School graduates
2007 Challenge Tour graduates
2017 European Tour Qualifying School graduates

References

External links

Chilean male golfers
European Tour golfers
Olympic golfers of Chile
Golfers at the 2016 Summer Olympics
Pan American Games medalists in golf
Pan American Games bronze medalists for Chile
Medalists at the 2015 Pan American Games
Golfers at the 2015 Pan American Games
Golfers at the 2019 Pan American Games
South American Games gold medalists for Chile
South American Games medalists in golf
Competitors at the 2014 South American Games
Chilean people of German descent
People from Valdivia
Sportspeople from Santiago
1974 births
Living people